Gan Ku (January, 1924 – July 25, 1993) was a Chinese male politician, who served as the vice chairperson of the Standing Committee of the National People's Congress.

References 

1924 births
1993 deaths
Vice Chairpersons of the National People's Congress